Margarito "Gary" Bustaliño Teves (born August 1, 1943) is a Filipino politician who served as Secretary of the Department of Finance of the Philippines. He was appointed to the position in July 2005 by President Gloria Macapagal Arroyo, following a mass resignation of her economic team.

In January 2009 he was named "Best Finance Minister" in Asia, a title given by London-based international finance magazine, The Banker.

Life and education 
Teves was born in Sangkol, Dipolog, Zamboanga, to Herminio Teves and Narcisa Bustaliño. Teves received his M.A. in Developmental Economics from Williams College in 1968.

Career

Congressman
He was elected congressman representing the 3rd district of Negros Oriental from 1987 to 1998.

Following his three terms in office—the maximum number allowed by the constitution—he was succeeded by his father, Herminio Teves.

Secretary of Finance
Teves was appointed as Secretary of the Department of Finance in July 2005 by President Gloria Macapagal Arroyo, following a mass resignation of her economic team.

As Finance Secretary, he oversaw the Arroyo administration's aggressive attempts to decrease the government's budget deficit.

Personal life
He is married to Loretto "Nini" Santos, and had three children together: Jennifer, Herminio Cirilo, and Kathyrine.

References

External links
Department of Finance
Gary B. Teves resume

|-

1943 births
Living people
People from Negros Oriental
Secretaries of Finance of the Philippines
Williams College alumni
Members of the House of Representatives of the Philippines from Negros Oriental
Arroyo administration cabinet members